The Arthur B. Heurtley House is located in the Chicago suburb of Oak Park, Illinois, United States. The house was designed by architect Frank Lloyd Wright and constructed in 1902. The Heurtley House is considered one of the earliest examples of a Frank Lloyd Wright house in full Prairie style. The house was added to the U.S. National Register of Historic Places when it was designated a National Historic Landmark on February 16, 2000.

History
While the Heurtleys owned the home it underwent three major changes: screens were fitted to the windows on the elevated porch, a breakfast room was added on the main floor, and the "wood room," as it was known on Wright's original drawing, was converted into a pantry or food storage area. It is thought that the breakfast room addition and wood room conversion were done through Frank Lloyd Wright's office but the dates remain unconfirmed.

In 1920 the house was purchased by Wright's sister, Jane Porter, and her husband, Andrew, who converted the two-story home into a duplex in the 1930s, with each floor separated into apartments. The Porters stayed in the Heurtley House for 26 years. Two subsequent owners altered the home further: the kitchens and bathrooms were modernized, the front loggia enclosed, and a black iron gate was added to the entryway. In addition, a master bathroom was added in the last fifteen feet of the main floor veranda, the living room inglenook and dining room breakfront were removed, and a second chimney and furnace were added.

The house was sold in poor condition 1997 for under $500,000. Between 1997 and 2002 the new owners, Ed & Diana Baehrend, spent $2.5 million on a complete restoration, which included the period furnishings. The work was overseen by restoration architect John Thorpe in collaboration with Doug Freerksen and his staff at Von Dreele-Freerksen Construction Company. All of the stained glass windows and the false skylights located in the upstairs living room  were restored by Morava Studios, which also created reproduction glass panels for doors to the reopened loggia area.

Architecture

The Heurtley House is one of Wright's earliest, fully mature Prairie style houses, and the patterns that he established with the home would eventually appear in many of his greatest works in that genre.  Exterior emphasis is on the horizontal, with strong detail in the wooden siding and high bands of windows.  The roof is low pitched, and features broad eaves.  Terraces and balconies bring outside living easily to the occupants.

The home is entered through a grade level front door into a deeply colored low ceilinged entry hall. Major spaces are raised above the surrounding grounds, and climbing the stairs to the upper level thrusts one into areas featuring soaring ceilings with trim echoing roof forms. The transition emphasizes leaving the outside world behind by ascending the stairs.  Fireplaces, symbolizing hearth and home, are centralized in the middle of the structure.   The house, uncommonly in the U. S., has its private spaces on the lower floor and public rooms on the second.

Notes

References
William Allin Storrer, The Frank Lloyd Wright Companion. University of Chicago Press, 2006, (S.074)

Frank Lloyd Wright buildings
Houses completed in 1902
Houses on the National Register of Historic Places in Cook County, Illinois
National Historic Landmarks in Illinois
Oak Park, Illinois